Madb or MADB can refer to:

Mythology
Medb, an Irish legendary figure in Proto-Indo-European religion, also called Queen Maeve

Science and medicine
madB, a protein-encoding gene in Phycomyces blakesleeanus
Mandibuloacral dysplasia with type B lipodystrophy, a type of Laminopathy
Carboxybiotin decarboxylase, an enzyme

Acronyms
Myanma Agricultural Development Bank
Minor actinide property database Integrated Nuclear Fuel Cycle Information System#Modules
Magyar agár database
Microarray database
Message Addressing Database, for WS-Addressing
Material Acquisition Database